Rentis railway station is a station on the Piraeus–Platy railway line in Agios Ioannis Rentis, a neighborhood of Piraeus. Originally opened on 30 June 1884 it was rebuilt to serve the Athens Suburban Railway lines when this section came into operation in June 2007. It owes its name to the area of Agios Ioannis Rentis, shortened to just Rentis.

History
The Station opened in its original form on 30 June 1884 on what was the Piraeus, Athens and Peloponnese line (or SPAP) build to connect Piraeus and Athens. In the early 20th Century, a large freight depot was built alongside the station, and was the main freight base of the Greek railways. In 1920 Hellenic State Railways or SEK was established, however, many railways, such as the SPAP continued to be run as a separate company, becoming an independent company once more two years later. Due to growing debts, the SPAP came under government control between 1939 and 1940. During the Axis occupation of Greece (1941–44), Athens was controlled by German military fourses, and the line used for the transport of troops and weapons. During the occupation (and especially during German withdrawal in 1944), the network was severely damaged by both the German army and Greek resistance groups. The track and rolling stock replacement took time following the civil war, with normal service levels resumed around 1948. In 1954 SPAP was nationalized once more. In 1962 the SPAP was amalgamated into SEK. In 1970 OSE became the legal successor to the SEK, taking over responsibilities for most of Greece's rail infrastructure. On 1 January 1971 the station, and most of the Greek rail infrastructure was transferred to the Hellenic Railways Organisation S.A., a state-owned corporation. Freight traffic declined sharply when the state-imposed monopoly of OSE for the transport of agricultural products and fertilisers ended in the early 1990s. Many small stations of the network with little passenger traffic were closed down.

In 2001 the infrastructure element of OSE was created, known as GAIAOSE, it would henceforth be responsible for the maintenance, of stations, bridges and other elements of the network, as well as the leasing and the sale of railway assists. In 2003, OSE launched "Proastiakos SA", as a subsidiary to serve the operation of the suburban network in the urban complex of Athens during the 2004 Olympic Games. In 2005, TrainOSE was created as a brand within OSE to concentrate on rail services and passenger interface. On 7 August 2005, the station was closed for major upgrades to allow the new suburban railway to use the station. On 3 June 2007, its extensive renovation and integration into the new suburban railway network were completed. In 2005, the station was closed for major upgrades to allow the new suburban railway to use the station.

On 3 June 2007, its extensive renovation and integration into the new suburban railway network as Line 1 and Line 2 of the Athens Suburban Railway were completed. In 2008, all Athens Suburban Railway services were transferred from OSE to TrainOSE. In 2009, with the Greek debt crisis unfolding OSE's Management was forced to reduce services across the network. Timetables were cutback and routes closed, as the government-run entity attempted to reduce overheads. In 2017 OSE's passenger transport sector was privatised as TrainOSE (Now Hellenic Train), currently, a wholly-owned subsidiary of Ferrovie dello Stato Italiane infrastructure, including stations, remained under the control of OSE. In July 2022, the station began being served by Hellenic Train, the rebranded TranOSE.

Facilities
The station building is located on an Island platform, with access to the platform level via stairs or lifts. The Station buildings are also equipped with a staffed ticket office. At platform level, there are sheltered seating in a new air-conditioned indoor passenger shelter and Dot-matrix display departure and arrival screens or timetable poster boards on both platforms. There is a small car park on-site. Currently, there is no local bus stop connecting the station.

Services

Since 15 May 2022, the following weekday services call at this station:

From 1904 and 2005, Rentis had direct services to Piraeus Port, on a now disused curve.

Station layout

Gallery

See also
Railway stations in Greece
Hellenic Railways Organization
Hellenic Train
Proastiakos

References

External links
 Rentis railway station - National Railway Network Greek Travel Pages

Piraeus (regional unit)
West Athens (regional unit)
Attica
Railway
Railway stations in Attica
Buildings and structures in Piraeus
Transport in Athens
Transport in Attica
Transport in West Attica
Railway stations opened in 1884
Railway stations opened in 2007